The Westpac Lifesaver Rescue Helicopter Service is a helicopter surf lifesaving service that operates in Australia.

Founded in 1973 by Surf Life Saving Australia, a not-for-profit organisation, the service has carried out more than 80,000 flights ranging from Aeromedical to search and rescue missions. The Westpac Life Saver Rescue Helicopter Service is the largest non-profit search and rescue and aeromedical retrieval service in Australia. Its aircraft and trained medical and operational crews respond quickly and effectively to emergencies threatening the life, health and safety of people caused through medical emergency, illness, natural disaster, accidents or mishap.

The naming rights sponsor of the helicopter services is Westpac, an Australian-based financial institution that also has operations in New Zealand.

Role
When contracted, the Westpac Life Saver Rescue Helicopters respond to medical emergencies throughout the most populous regions of Australia, covering hundreds of thousands of square kilometres of bushland, mountain ranges, highways as well as the coastlines of New South Wales, Queensland, South Australia, Tasmania, Victoria and Western Australia.

The helicopters are tasked to undertake a number of different missions:

Search and rescue missions:  tasked to locate a distress beacon activated such as; from a downed aircraft or vessel out at sea.
Coastal Surveillance: Routine and tasked patrolling along coastal shores including; shark spotting, rescue, hazard identification. 
Primary missions:  tasked to an industrial, recreational, motor vehicle accident or natural disaster to deliver their medical expertise and provide life saving support.
Secondary missions:  tasked to transport a patient from a country hospital to a metropolitan hospital for specialist care.
Recovery missions:  tasked to recover a body from an inaccessible area.
Inter-agency Operations: Providing support to other emergency services and governments, such as police, fire, ambulance, SES, and AMSA.

Organisational structure
While the service operates under the umbrella name of Westpac Lifesaver Rescue Helicopter Service, autonomous, yet affiliated, non-profit organisations deliver the service to meet the specific needs of local communities. Each organisation is governed by a Board with local management and an advisory committee. The relevant organisations are:
 NSW - Greater Sydney
 NSW - Northern NSW
 Qld - Westpac Lifesaver Rescue Helicopter Service
 SA - Westpac Lifesaver Rescue Helicopter
 Tas - Westpac Lifesaver Rescue Helicopter
 Vic – Westpac Rescue Helicopter
 WA - Westpac Lifesaver Rescue Helicopter

Operations
The Westpac Life Saver Rescue Helicopter Service operates in six states in Australia. The Northern NSW and Tasmania Service is contracted to fly helicopters with on-board specialist doctors and paramedics.

In New South Wales, there are five operation bases and a total of six rescue aircraft. Westpac 1, 2, 3, 4 are spread across 3 bases; Lake Macquarie Airport Newcastle,  Airport,  Airport. The 4 aircraft rotate between these bases covering Newcastle/Hunter to South East Queensland. In Sydney, Lifesaver 21 is based; Lifesaver 23 is based in  both aircraft are operated by Helistar. With support of major sponsor, Westpac, Greater Sydney opened a summer-time base at Moruya Airport in December 2010 for three months. A total of 67 missions were achieved in the first season. The previous Labor Government provided funding for Sydney to return to all-hours operations (from 1 October 2011) and the south coast service would become a year-round, day-time operation (from 1 December 2011).  Southern now operates two bases covering from the Central Coast to the Victorian border.

In Queensland, the Service patrols the southeast coast, performing beach patrols, search & rescue, shark sightings and warnings and provides assistance to Surf Lifesavers in the water and on the beach, utilising (VH-NVG) a Eurocopter EC135. The service also operates three helicopters on behalf of Queensland Police (VH-NVK, VH-NVI, VH-NVH), all being MBB Bo 105 models. In 2020 former Westpac-branded helicopter (VH-NVH) (Lifesaver 46) was removed from service to be transitioned to operate as Polair, Lifesaver 46 was replaced by VH-NVF (March 2021). In late 2021 Surf Lifesaving Queensland took delivery of former  4 from NSW Police (VH-POF) for modernisation of the current QPS  fleet towards a Eurocopter EC135 P2 operation.

In Victoria, the Westpac Life Saver Rescue Helicopter provides an aerial surveillance service, which currently consists of Lifesaver 30 and Lifesaver 31.  The Westpac Lifesaver Rescue Helicopter conducts regular patrols and undertakes rescue missions across Victoria. The service works closely with the volunteer beach patrols, paid lifeguards, and offshore services, and is readily available to assist other emergency services and government agencies. The service undertakes community education and promotional activities throughout the year and will be available all hours for call-outs. Life Saving Victoria also works closely with the police air-wing and marine rescue inits which enables the fastest response to emergency calls.

In Tasmania, the Service provides emergency services and has a contract with Ambulance Tasmania as well as the Tasmanian Police.

In South Australia, Service helicopters patrol beaches on weekends, public holidays and busy weekdays over summer from November through to March each year. It works together with other Surf Lifesaving support services, including Lifesaver 2 and Lifesaver 3, the state Jet Rescue Boats.

The Service launched operations in Western Australia in December 2008 at Rous Head, Fremantle with patrols beaches on weekends, public holidays and busy weekdays over the summer months. It now operates two helicopters: Perth Metropolitan Service and South West Service. The Perth Metropolitan Service patrols from Mandurah to Yanchep and out to Rottnest Island. The Perth Service operates on weekends in September and daily from October to April. The South West Service started in 2013 at Busselton Regional Airport and patrols the areas between Bunbury and Hamelin Bay. It is operational from September to April on Weekends, public holidays and school holidays.

Flight crew
Search and rescue (SAR) and surveillance: The flight crew usually consists of one pilot (or two pilots on varying aircraft), one air crew officer, and one rescue swimmer. The crews consists of both paid and volunteer positions.

Aeromedical: As well as pilots there are several specialist crew-members. The air crewman assists the pilot with communication; navigation; and landing by providing the pilot with accurate clearance; helicopter safety; and operating the rescue winch. A rescue crewman's duties include going down the winch, scaling cliff faces and swimming. Rescue crew are also responsible for passenger safety during Passenger Transport Operations. Special Casualty Access Team (SCAT) paramedics possess skills in intensive care/Advance Life Support (ALS) and trauma management; and have skills in accessing and treating patients in difficult or remote locations. SCATs work closely with the local accredited rescue units to access, assess, triage and treat patients. When required, SCATs may also provide assistance with the extrication of the patient. They provide patient care and are responsible for preparing the aeromedical evacuation missions, coordinating with the flight crew and other medical personnel, as well as liaising with retrieval services. Doctors specially qualified in Emergency Care and retrieval medicine are also part of the team. This enables the crew to provide critical care to a patients anywhere it is needed.

Aircraft
The following aircraft, bases and coverage summarise the activities of the Service:

Newcastle, Lismore, Tamworth are part of the Westpac operations but fall under the name Westpac Northern Region Rescue Helicopter service. They operate 24/7 using 4 AgustaWestland AW139.

The Sydney and South Coast operation replaced the 2 existing MBB/Kawasaki BK 117 with new upgraded versions operated by Helistar during 2020.

The Victoria service saw the addition of Lifesaver 31 in the 2020/21 season, as a dedicated surveillance aircraft equipped with high definition cameras and a FLIR device.

The Queensland Sunshine Coast Helicopter (VH-NVH) MBB Bo 105 was removed from service July 2020 for transition to Queensland Police operations (Polair), replaced by (VH-NVF) Eurocopter EC135 P2.

Currently in use

Formerly operated 
 Eurocopter AS365 Dauphin
 MBB/Kawasaki BK 117
 Cessna 337G Super Skymaster
 Bell 412
MBB Bo 105

Helicopter emergency medical service in New South Wales
Since the 1970s helicopters have been part of the fleet of NSW Ambulance. The SLSA-owned Westpac Life Saver Rescue Helicopter Service (WLSRHS) started receiving NSW Government funding for its service in 1978; with funding and tasking arrangements put in place in 1989. By 2006 there were nine helicopters operating across the state. Reviews commissioned by NSW Ambulance during 2004 and 2005 identified a number of systemic weaknesses with the services provided by both the WLSHRS and by CareFlight, delivered under a mix of government funding, corporate sponsorship and fundraising. During 2006, a competitive tenders process commenced to provide helicopters in Greater Sydney, which covers the Sydney,  and  areas, as well as other locations across NSW. In December 2006, John Hatzistergos, the NSW Minister for Health, announced the government's decision to award a contract for the Greater Sydney area to Canadian Helicopter Corporation (CHC), which was already providing a service in Wollongong and Canberra, for commencement from May 2007; effectively terminating the contracts for the Greater Sydney area held by WLSHRS and CareFlight. No interstate operations were affected by the change in contract. A summary of the outcome of the competitive tendering process is set out below:

The decision to appoint a for profit corporation to deliver the service, in lieu of not-profit entities, drew considerable media, community, and political attention. As a result, the NSW Auditor-General was instructed to delivere a performance audit of the helicopter emergency medical services contract process and whether satisfactory outcomes for Greater Sydney were delivered under awarding the contract to CHC. Reporting in 2010, he found that:
Ahead of the publication of the Auditor-General's report, it was reported in December 2009 that CHC were seeking to sell its Australian air services arm, following a series of mishaps including engine failures, windows falling out of the aircraft, no installed air conditioning system inside the cabin as well as response delays to accident sites.

In 2011, Jillian Skinner, the NSW Minister for Health, commissioned a strategic review of the NSW Ambulance Service, including its aeromedical operations. Ernst & Young were engaged to assist with the review; and delivered a final report with 56 recommendations that were released for public comment from December 2012 to mid March 2013. Following consideration of the 73 submissions received, and further consultation with clinical and aviation experts, in 2013 the NSW Government released the Reform Plan for Aeromedical (Rotary Wing) Retrieval Services in NSW. Along with other reforms, two key issues impact the ongoing operations of the WLSHRS:

 The helicopter retrieval fleet will be standardised to two types of helicopters for the State, and new helicopters will be phased in as part of the procurement and implementation process for longer contract terms of between 7 – 10 years;
 NSW Health will structure helicopter contracts around two regions within NSW so that each region has one operator, including options for consortia arrangements.

In December 2014, it was announced that the partnership of the Northern Region SLSA and the Hunter Region SLSA had been successful in the NSW Aeromedical Retrieval Network tender. As a result, the service will re-equip with AgustaWestland AW139 helicopters from early 2017 to be operated from bases the existing base in Tamworth as well as upgraded bases in Lismore and Newcastle

The first of four AgustaWestland AW139 arrived at the Newcastle Westpac Rescue base on 10 June 2016.

See also
June 2007 Hunter Region and Central Coast storms
MV Pasha Bulker
Auckland Rescue Helicopter Trust
Piha Surf Life Saving Club

References

External links

Hunter Region SLSA Helicopter Rescue Service
Surf Life Saving Australia's Westpac Lifesaver Helicopter Rescue Service
Southern Region SLSA Helicopter Rescue Service
Northern Region SLSA Helicopter Rescue Service
Surf Life Saving Queensland's Westpac Lifesaver Helicopter Rescue Service
Surf Life Saving South Australia's Westpac Lifesaver Helicopter Rescue Service
Tasmanian Air Rescue Trust
Life Saving Victoria's Westpac Lifesaver Rescue Helicopters
Surf Life Saving Western Australia's Westpac Lifesaver Helicopter Rescue Service

Air ambulance services in Australia
Surf lifesaving
Emergency services in South Australia
Emergency services in New South Wales
Emergency services in Tasmania
Emergency services in Queensland
Emergency medical services in Australia
Emergency services in Victoria (Australia)
Emergency services in Western Australia